Early general elections were held in Anguilla on 9 March 1984. The result was a victory for the Anguilla National Alliance, which won four of the seven seats in the House of Assembly. Chief Minister Ronald Webster lost his seat.

Results
Bob Rogers and Clive Smith were appointed as the nominated members.

References

Elections in Anguilla
Anguilla
1984 in Anguilla
Anguilla
March 1984 events in North America
Election and referendum articles with incomplete results